Tranent Juniors Football Club are a Scottish football club based in the town of Tranent, East Lothian. The team was promoted from the East of Scotland Football League Premier Division to the Lowland League in 2022, having moved from the junior leagues in 2018. Despite leaving the junior leagues, the club has retained the term "Juniors" as part of their identity. Their home ground is Foresters Park and club colours are maroon and white.

The club's greatest honour was winning the Scottish Junior Cup in 1934–35, defeating Petershill 6–1 at Ibrox Park in front of a crowd of 22,000. This remains the joint record margin of victory in a Junior Cup final. The club were also runners-up to Yoker Athletic in the 1932–33 final after a replay.

East Lothian Council Archives holds a selection of images of the team playing and posing with their trophies.

Managers
The club was managed on an interim basis since November 2016 by Kenny Rafferty and former Raith Rovers player Darren Smith. On 9 February 2017, Kenny Rafferty and former Raith Rovers player Darren Smith become full-time bosses. Rafferty and Smith resigned in November 2017, following a Scottish Junior Cup defeat.

Johnny Harvey replaced Calvin Shand as manager in February 2020. Tranent announced that Harvey had left his position on 24 September 2020 Harvey disputed this and claimed he was sacked by the club.

Calum Elliot was announced as the club's new manager on 26 September 2020 until August 2022 when Elliot was replaced by Colin Nish and his assistant manager Steven Hislop.

Current squad
As of 8 December 2020

Honours
East of Scotland League

 Champions: 2021–22

Scottish Junior Cup
 Winners: 1934–35
 Runners-up: 1932–33

Fife & Lothians Cup
 Winners: 2016–17

East of Scotland Junior Cup
 Winners (10): 1913–14, 1919–20, 1930–31, 1931–32, 1933–34, 1935–36, 1937–38, 1959–60, 1978–79, 2016–17

Other honours
 King Cup winners: 2018–19
East Region South Division: winners 2015–16
Midlothian League winners: 1928–29, 1930–31, 1936–37
Renton Cup winners: 1924–25

References

External links 
 Official club site
 Twitter
 Facebook

 
Football clubs in Scotland
Football in East Lothian
Association football clubs established in 1911
Scottish Junior Football Association clubs
1911 establishments in Scotland
East of Scotland Football League teams
Tranent
Lowland Football League teams